Nisheeth Kumar Singh from the Swissgrid ag, Fislisbach, Aargau, Switzerland was named Fellow of the Institute of Electrical and Electronics Engineers (IEEE) in 2012 for contributions to online control and analysis for power systems.

References

Fellow Members of the IEEE
Living people
Year of birth missing (living people)
Place of birth missing (living people)